Sunrise is the 11th and final album by American soul singer Jimmy Ruffin, it was released in May 1980 and was produced by Robin Gibb (of the Bee Gees) and Blue Weaver. The songs were co-written by Gibb either with Weaver and/or his brothers. This album was released in US, Netherlands, UK, Norway and Germany. The lead single "Hold On (To My Love)" reached top ten in UK and US.

The last song recorded for the album was "Songbird" was originally recorded by the Bee Gees and released on the album Main Course in 1975. "Where Do I Go", a country-style ballad, is sung by Jimmy Ruffin with Marcy Levy.

Track listing
All tracks written by Robin Gibb and Blue Weaver, except where noted.
Side one
"Hold On (To My Love)" – 3:32
"Forever Forever" (Barry Gibb, Robin Gibb, Maurice Gibb) – 3:19
"Night of Love" – 3:50
"Searchin'" – 2:54
"Changin' Me" – 3:10
Side two
"Where Do I Go" (Barry Gibb, Robin Gibb, Maurice Gibb, Andy Gibb) – 3:53
"Two People" – 4:07
"Jealousy" – 3:58
"Songbird" (Barry Gibb, Robin Gibb, Maurice Gibb, Blue Weaver) – 4:40

Personnel

 Jimmy Ruffin – lead vocal
 Robin Gibb – backing vocal
 Barry Gibb – backing vocal on "Where Do I Go"
 Blue Weaver – keyboards, synthesizer, orchestral arrangement, arranger
 Bobby Cadway – guitar
 Alan Kendall – guitar
 Dennis Bryon – drums, backing vocal
 George Perry – bass, backing vocal
 Yvonne Lewis – backing vocal
 Krystal Davis – backing vocal
 Janet Wright – backing vocal
 Chuck Kirkpatrick – bass
 Marcy Levy – lead vocal on "Where Do I Go"
 Joe Lala – percussion
 Pete Carr – guitar
 George Terry – guitar
 Charles Chalmers – backing vocal
 Sandy Rhodes – backing vocal
 Donna Rhodes – backing vocal
 Mike Lewis – orchestral arrangement, arranger
The Boneroo Horns on "Jealousy"
 Whit Sidener
 Ken Faulk
 Jeff Kievett
 Don Bonsanti
 Jamis Marshall
Production
 Greg Kolotkin – sound engineer (Kingdom Studios)
 Dennis Hetzendorfer – sound engineer (Criteria Studios)
 Robin Gibb – producer
 Blue Weaver – producer

References

1980 albums
Albums produced by Robin Gibb
RSO Records albums